Arwut Chinnapasaen (born December 3, 1980; nickname: 'X') is a Thai former swimmer, who specialized in sprint freestyle events. He claimed two gold medals in the 50 m freestyle at the Southeast Asian Games (2003 and 2005), before losing out to Daniel Coakley of the Philippines in 2007.

Chinnapasaen qualified for the men's 50 m freestyle at the 2004 Summer Olympics in Athens, by posting a FINA B-standard entry time of 23.20 from the Southeast Asian Games in Hanoi, Vietnam. He challenged seven other swimmers on the sixth heat, including three-time Olympian Julio Santos of Ecuador. He raced to sixth place by one hundredth of a second (0.01) behind Cyprus' Chrysanthos Papachrysanthou in 23.52. Chinnapasaen failed to advance into the semifinals, as he matched a forty-sixth place tie with SEA Games medalist and former rival Allen Ong of Malaysia in the preliminaries.

Chinnapasaen is currently Head of Aquatics at St Andrews International School Bangkok. He has been a swimming coach at St Andrews since August 2015.

References

1980 births
Living people
Arwut Chinnapasaen
Arwut Chinnapasaen
Swimmers at the 2004 Summer Olympics
Swimmers at the 1998 Asian Games
Swimmers at the 2002 Asian Games
Swimmers at the 2006 Asian Games
Swimmers at the 2010 Asian Games
Arwut Chinnapasaen
Southeast Asian Games medalists in swimming
Arwut Chinnapasaen
Arwut Chinnapasaen
Competitors at the 2001 Southeast Asian Games
Competitors at the 2003 Southeast Asian Games
Competitors at the 2005 Southeast Asian Games
Competitors at the 2007 Southeast Asian Games
Competitors at the 2009 Southeast Asian Games
Arwut Chinnapasaen
Arwut Chinnapasaen